Sheila Mary Mitchell (born 1925) is a British actress and author.

Early years 
Born in 1925, Sheila Mitchell was a teenager during the Second World War and spent the last two years of that time in the WRNS (Women's Royal Navy Service) working at Bletchley Park. She then trained at the Central School of Speech and Drama in London. Lucky enough to work for BBC Radio while she was still a student, broadcasting remained a substantial part of her work, moving into recording Audio Books.

Career 
She found employment both in theatre – The Royal Shakespeare Company, Prospect at the Old Vic, West End productions working with stars like Donald Sinden, John Mills and Derek Jacobi as well as in TV – among other programmes, Jeeves and Wooster, All Creatures Great and Small and countless sitcoms. Writing has been a late addition and she was very nearly 95 before appearing in print for the first time with the publication of H.R.F. Keating: A Life of Crime.

Personal life 
On leaving drama school she spent a few years working in theatre and it was while she was a member of the Swindon repertory company that she met H.R.F. (Harry) Keating who was employed by the local newspaper not only as a reporter and sub-editor but also as their theatre reviewer. They married in 1953 and after the birth of their first child in 1955 her career was put on hold and not resumed until the 1970s by which time they had four children.

Awards 
At the Mystery Readers International, she won Macavity awards in 2020/21 in the Best Mystery Critical/Biography category for H.R.F. Keating: A Life of Crime published by Level Best Books of America.

Filmography

References 

1925 births
Living people
British television actresses
British film actresses
British critics
People from Surrey